Trema may refer to:

 a Greek and Latin root meaning hole
 Tréma, a word in French meaning diaeresis
 more generally, two dots (diacritic)
 Trema (plant), a genus of about 15 species of small evergreen trees
 Tréma (record label), a French record label, now defunct
 Trema, Croatia, a village near Sveti Ivan Žabno in central Croatia
 a term coined by German neurologist Klaus Conrad in his 1958 monograph on schizophrenia

See also 
 Pseudomonas tremae
 Trematoda
 Trematosauria